Louis Fred Stokes (born March 14, 1964) is a former American football defensive end who played ten seasons in the National Football League. He played professionally for the Los Angeles/St. Louis Rams, Washington Redskins and New Orleans Saints

Biography 
Stokes was born in Vidalia, Georgia. Stokes played college football at Georgia Southern University.

While attending High School in Vidalia, Georgia, Fred excelled in Basketball, and Track. However, it was not until his senior year that he decided to give football a try.  As a result of his outstanding play on the field, Stokes was offered a full scholarship to play football for the newly formed Georgia Southern Eagles in Statesboro, Ga. under the legendary leadership of Coach Erk Russell. While at Georgia Southern, Fred played on two National Championship teams (1985 and 1986).  Stokes was one of two players on his team voted First-team All-America after his senior season as an offensive tackle.

In 1987, Stokes was drafted into the National Football League where he would spend the next ten years playing defensive end for the Los Angeles/St. Louis Rams, Washington Redskins, and the New Orleans Saints.  Stokes played in Super Bowl XXVI with the 1991 Washington Redskins against the Buffalo Bills. In that game, Stokes recorded two and half sacks, one forced fumble and one fumble recovery.  Fred's teammates affectionately labeled him "Big Play Stokes" because of his knack for making the "BIG PLAY" at just the right time of a ball game.

After retiring from the NFL, Fred went back to his Alma Mater (Georgia Southern University) and completed his degree in 1998. Over the next several years, Fred would travel the globe selling and marketing food products to the military.

In 2007, Fred established Fred Stokes Foods.

Fred and his wife Regina have three sons and currently live in Orlando, Florida

Professional career
He was drafted in the 12th round of the 1987 NFL Draft by the Los Angeles Rams. He started in Super Bowl XXVI.

Life after the NFL
Stokes founded the Fred Stokes Youth Ranch in his home town after his retirement and wrote an autobiography, "The Bridge That Brought Me Over."

See also
 St. Louis Rams

References

External links
 
 Pro-Football-Reference.com: Fred Stokes
 databaseFootball.com: Fred Stokes

American football defensive ends
Georgia Southern Eagles football players
Los Angeles Rams players
Washington Redskins players
St. Louis Rams players
New Orleans Saints players
People from Vidalia, Georgia
Players of American football from Georgia (U.S. state)
1964 births
Living people